KOI-74 is an eclipsing binary star in the constellation of Cygnus. It lies in the field of view of the Kepler Mission and was determined to have a companion object in orbit around it which is smaller and hotter than the main star.

KOI-74b

KOI-74b is a hot compact object orbiting KOI-74. The orbit of KOI-74b around the main star takes 5.18875 days to complete. Analysis of relativistic boosting of light in the Kepler data indicates that it is likely to be a low mass white dwarf of approximately 0.22 solar masses, resulting from an earlier phase of mass transfer in a binary system when the object underwent its giant phase.

See also
KOI-81, a similar system also discovered by the Kepler Mission.
Kepler Object of Interest, stars observed to have transits by the Kepler Mission

References

A-type main-sequence stars
Cygnus (constellation)
Eclipsing binaries
White dwarfs
74